The 1982 California gubernatorial election occurred on November 2, 1982. The Republican nominee, Attorney General George Deukmejian, narrowly defeated the Democratic nominee, Los Angeles Mayor Tom Bradley. Incumbent Governor Jerry Brown did not seek reelection to a third term (although he was elected again much later in 2010 and 2014).

Primary election summary
In the Democratic primary, Los Angeles Mayor Tom Bradley easily defeated State Senator John Garamendi and Mario G. Obledo. On the Republican side, it was a two-man race between Lieutenant Governor Mike Curb and Attorney General George Deukmejian. Deukmejian won the primary with nearly 55% of the vote.

General election
Early indications were that it would be a close race but as the campaign went on, Bradley slowly increased his lead in the polls. Despite this, the outcome was still in doubt as election night wore on. A large late surge of absentee ballots (many from conservative Orange County and Deukmejian's home area of Long Beach) helped tip the balance in his favor. The incorrect polling numbers led to the theory — later dubbed "the Bradley effect" — that a statistically significant number of voters had given inaccurate responses when questioned by pollsters.

Results by county

References
 http://www.joincalifornia.com/election/1982-11-02
 1982 Gubernatorial primary elections

Gubernatorial
1982
1982 United States gubernatorial elections